"Jacob's Ladder" is a song by the Canadian rock band Rush. It was released on their 1980 album Permanent Waves.

Composition and recording
The song was developed on the band's warm-up tour during soundchecks.

"Jacob's Ladder" uses several time and key signatures, and possesses a dark, ominous feel in its first half. The lyrics are based on a simple concept; a vision of sunlight breaking through storm clouds. The song's title is a reference to the natural phenomenon of the sun breaking through the clouds in visible rays, which in turn was named after the Biblical ladder to heaven on which Jacob saw angels ascending and descending in a vision.

Drummer and lyricist Neil Peart said of the song:  Whereas most of the ideas we were dealing with this time were on the lesser side, and in some cases, like in "Jacobs Ladder", looked at as a cinematic idea. We created all the music first to summon up an image – the effect of Jacob's Ladder – and paint the picture, with the lyrics added, just as a sort of little detail, later, to make it more descriptive.

Robert Telleria said in the Rush book Merely Players:  Part heavy metal, part New Age, this song is not about the vision seen by Jacob in the Bible but rather the atmospheric phenomena that has been named after that image. The tympani pounding parts rock like apocalyptic earthquakes. Alex plays like he’s ascending the ladder in the clouds.

Live performances
In early 2015, during Rush's R40 Live Tour, frontman Geddy Lee incorrectly stated that the song had never been played live before, but he was corrected by fans on the internet.

The live albums Exit...Stage Left (1981) and R40 Live (2015) include performances of this song.

Reception
Odyssey rated "Jacob's Ladder" 5/5, writing "It's [sic] repetitiveness and unique sound make it great". They ranked the song number 41 on their ranking of every Rush song.

Ultimate Classic Rock ranked the song 17th best on their list of "All 167 Rush Songs Ranked Worst to Best".

References

Rush (band) songs
1980 songs
Songs written by Geddy Lee
Songs written by Alex Lifeson
Songs written by Neil Peart
Song recordings produced by Terry Brown (record producer)